We Are is the debut EP by Australian band Cassette Kids. The band won the Triple J Unearthed competition in 2008, which directly contributed to this EP.

Track listing
"You Take It" - 3:19
"Forwards Backwards" - 2:38
"Anywhere But Home" - 3:12
"Techno Dan" - 3:24
"Meant To Be" - 3:37
"Acrobat" - 3:01
"Listen Now" - 2:31

References

2008 EPs